Elana Eden (born Elana Lani Cooper, 1 May 1940) is an Israeli actress of film, television, and stage, best known for her film debut as the title role in 20th Century Fox's biblical epic The Story of Ruth (1960).

Early life
Eden was born in Bat Yam, Tel Aviv District, British Mandate of Palestine. Her father, Zvi Cooper, was a Polish-born landscape gardener who had settled in Palestine after World War I. Her mother (born  1910) was born in Russia. She has two older siblings: a brother Moti and a sister Tamar. She learned English at school and later attended high school at a kibbutz of the Sharon plain. She worked as a writer for Tel Aviv's newspaper Haaretz.

Eden decided to become an actress after seeing a performance of George Bernard Shaw's play Pygmalion when she was 15 years old. She won a scholarship to study acting at Israel's Habima Theatre Drama School and made her stage debut in the play Lysistrata, which she performed over 50 times in various locations in Israel.

Career
After having served as a machine gunner and volunteer with the Israeli Army, Eden auditioned for the film The Diary of Anne Frank in London in 1957, and she was one of the five finalists for the part until Millie Perkins was cast.

When searching for an actress to play the title role in 20th Century Fox's CinemaScope biblical epic The Story of Ruth (1960), producer Samuel G. Engel remembered her previous screen test for The Diary of Anne Frank and Eden arrived in Hollywood in August 1959 to do more screen tests for the part of Ruth. Of the 29 actresses who were tested, Eden was cast as Ruth. The film crew changed her stage name from "Elana Cooper" to "Elana Eden", because "Cooper did not sound Jewish." For the film, she lost 10 pounds in three weeks, giving up "bread and butter, sour cream, rich sauces and cakes" for "steak, cottage cheese and fresh fruit." Of her portrayal, Variety wrote: "She gives a performance of dignity, projecting an inner strength through a delicate veneer." Daniel A. Poling, editor of the Christian Herald, thought that Eden's portrayal of Ruth was "worthy of an Oscar." Her performance was also complimented by columnist Hedda Hopper.

After her appearance in The Story of Ruth, Eden appeared in several television series in both the United States and Israel. In February 1961, she played Shasme Hasmar in the Adventures in Paradise episode "Who Is Sylvia?". She played another role, a young Czech woman named Anna, in The Barbara Stanwyck Show episode "The Hitch-Hiker" (1961). She also appeared in Trunk to Cairo (1966), starring Audie Murphy, George Sanders, and Marianne Koch, and the 1968 episode "The Revolutionary" of The Name of the Game.

Personal life
Eden married Israeli author and playwright Nissim Aloni in 1962 and later divorced him in 1965. She later married American composer Fredric "Fred" Myrow on 6 June 1969. They had three daughters: Rachael, Shira, and Neora.

Eden was a speaker at the "kickoff" dinner for the 1967 United Jewish Appeal campaign and the Modesto Jewish Welfare in Modesto, California.

Filmography

Television

Plays
 Lysistrata
 Tuvia Ha'Choleh
 The Diary of Anne Frank

References

External links

1940 births
20th Century Studios contract players
Living people
Israeli film actresses
Israeli stage actresses
Israeli television actresses
Israeli people of Polish-Jewish descent
Israeli people of Russian-Jewish descent
Jewish Israeli actresses
People from Bat Yam